Petri Purho (born 1983 in Kouvola, Finland) is a Finnish game developer and a cofounder of the game studio Nolla Games. He has previously also worked at Finnish independent video game developer studio Frozenbyte. He is best-known for the roguelite Noita and the puzzler Crayon Physics Deluxe, which won the Seumas McNally Grand Prize at the Independent Games Festival in 2008.

Purho initially made a name for himself as a rapid game prototyper. Almost all of his early games were created within one week as a massive prototyping project. Most common element of these prototypes are various bonuses for successful combos and/or chain reactions. These games were mainly created using open-source technologies.

Crayon Physics 

Crayon Physics  was Purho's tenth rapid game prototype and was coded in five days. It is a slow-paced puzzle game based on rigid bodies physics.

References

External links 
 Kloonigames - Homepage of Petri Purho
 

1983 births
People from Kouvola
Finnish video game designers
Video game programmers
Living people
Finnish computer programmers
Indie video game developers